Stöckl or Stoeckl is a surname. Notable people with the surname include:

Albert Stöckl, German philosopher and theologian
Eduard de Stoeckl (1820–1883), Russian diplomat
Ernst Stöckl (1912–2000), Austrian chess player
Ingrid Stöckl
Markus Stöckl